Pseudomiccolamia is a genus of longhorn beetles of the subfamily Lamiinae, containing the following species:

 Pseudomiccolamia pulchra Pic, 1916
 Pseudomiccolamia siamensis (Breuning, 1938)

References

Pteropliini